Four Scottish Dances (Op.59) is an orchestral set of light music pieces composed by Malcolm Arnold in 1957 for the BBC Light Music Festival.

The dances
Arnold's set, or suite, consists of four dances inspired by, although not based on, Scottish country folk tunes and dances. Although the individual dances are not titled, each is denoted by a separate tempo or style marking.

The composer's notations in the score, including his metronome indications (M.M.), are:

 I. Pesante (♩ = 104)
 II. Vivace (♩ = 160)
 III. Allegretto (♩ = 96)
 IV. Con brio (♩ = 144)

While Arnold did not title the four pieces individually, his music publisher (Novello & Co) has provided notes, which are often employed by annotators for orchestral and concert programs. The first dance, Novello observes, is "in the style of a strathspey"; the second, a "lively reel." The song-like and graceful third dance evokes "a calm summer's day in the Hebrides"; while the last is "a lively fling."

The dances are collectively intended to evoke Scotland, and utilize timbres intended to imitate bagpipes, as well as musical devices such as reel and Scotch snap rhythms. The composer also employs comic elements, such as a "tipsy" middle section in the second dance, in which the ensemble abruptly slows from a lively vivace to meno mosso (quarter note = 112), whereupon a single bassoon plays a plodding solo marked by upward and downward slides, or glissandi, as well as staggering, syncopated rhythms. (Beethoven employs a solo bassoon for somewhat similar comic effect in the rustic third-movement scherzo — "Merry Gathering of Country Folk" — of his Pastoral Symphony.)

The first performance was given at the Royal Festival Hall on 8 June 1957 with the BBC Concert Orchestra conducted by the composer.

Instrumentation

Strings
Strings
 Harp
 Woodwinds
 One piccolo
 One flute 
 Two clarinets in B♭
 Two bassoons
Brass
 Four horns in F
 Two trumpets in B♭ 
 Three trombones
Percussion
 Timpani
 Cymbals
 Side drum
 Bass drum
 Woodblock 
 Tam-tam

Arrangements
for wind band by John Paynter, 1978
for brass band by Ray Farr, 1984
 for wind quintet by Hugh Levey, 2022 www.woodwindly.com 
for piano by John York
for piano & violin by David Gedge

Selected commercial recordings
1959 Malcolm Arnold conducting the London Philharmonic Orchestra on Everest Records SDBR 3021 (re-released on Everest 9006). 
1979 Malcolm Arnold conducting the London Philharmonic Orchestra on Lyrita LP and CD: SRCD.201
1996 Andrew Penny conducting the Queensland Symphony Orchestra on Naxos Records 8.553526 (Sir Malcolm Arnold: Dances)

Of John Paynter's wind band arrangement

1995 Jerry Junkin conducting the Dallas Wind Symphony on Reference Recordings RR-66CD (Arnold for Band)

See also
 Dirk dance
English Dances
 List of Scottish country dances
 Scottish country dance
 Scottish highland dance
 Scottish sword dances

References

External links
Malcolm Arnold homepage 
HM Records catalogue

Compositions by Malcolm Arnold
1957 compositions
Light music compositions
Orchestral suites